Ugolino Martelli (died 1523) was a Roman Catholic prelate who served as Bishop of Narni (1517–1523)
and Bishop of Lecce (1511–1517).

Biography
On 9 Apr 1511, Ugolino Martelli was appointed during the papacy of Pope Julius II as Bishop of Lecce.
On 18 May 1517, he was appointed during the papacy of Pope Leo X as Bishop of Narni.
He served as Bishop of Narni until his death in 1523.

References

External links and additional sources
 (for Chronology of Bishops) 
 (for Chronology of Bishops) 
 (Chronology of Bishops) 
 (Chronology of Bishops) 

16th-century Italian Roman Catholic bishops
Bishops appointed by Pope Julius II
Bishops appointed by Pope Leo X
1523 deaths